The Park County Courthouse and Jail in Fairplay, Colorado was built in 1874.  It was listed on the National Register of Historic Places in 1979.

When listed in 1979, the courthouse was the oldest operating courthouse in the state.

The courthouse is a squarish two-story building with a full basement.  The jail is a one-story gabled stone structure.

References

External links

County courthouses in Colorado
National Register of Historic Places in Park County, Colorado
Government buildings completed in 1874